Acianthera yauaperyensis is a species of orchid.

yauaperyensis